Liberty Township is one of the eighteen townships of Delaware County, Ohio, United States. The 2000 census reported a population of 15,429 in the township, 9,182 of whom lived in the unincorporated portions of the township.  This was a significant increase from the 1990 census, at which time its population was only 3,790. As of the 2010 census the population of the township was 26,172.

Geography
Located in the southwestern part of the county, it borders the following townships and city:
Delaware Township - north
Berlin Township - northeast
Orange Township - east
Sharon Township, Franklin County - southeast corner
Perry Township, Franklin County - south
Dublin - southwest
Concord Township - west

The city of Powell is located in southern Liberty Township, and the ghost town of Carpenter's Mill lies in the township.

Name and history
It is one of twenty-five Liberty Townships statewide.

The first non-American Indian settler of Liberty Township - also of Delaware County - was Capt. Nathan Carpenter, who settled in the township on May 1, 1801, after a journey of over 2½ months from New York City. Liberty Township was also "one of the three original townships into which the county was divided for temporary purposes, at the time of its formation."

Government
The township is governed by a three-member board of trustees, who are elected in November of odd-numbered years to a four-year term beginning on the following January 1. Two are elected in the year after the presidential election and one is elected in the year before it. There is also an elected township fiscal officer, who serves a four-year term beginning on April 1 of the year after the election, which is held in November of the year before the presidential election. Vacancies in the fiscal officership or on the board of trustees are filled by the remaining trustees.

References

External links

Township website
County website
Regional Planning website

Townships in Delaware County, Ohio
Townships in Ohio